The 2006 United States Senate election in Hawaii was held November 7, 2006. Incumbent Democrat Daniel Akaka won re-election to his third full term.

Democratic primary

Candidates 
 Daniel Akaka, incumbent U.S. Senator
 Ed Case, U.S. Representative

Campaign 
Case had stated that although he has the deepest respect for Daniel Akaka, Hawaii is in a time of transition with regard to the state's representation in Congress which requires that the state phase in the next generation to provide continuity in that service. He had warned the state would lose all clout in Washington if the state's two US Senators, both of whom are over 80 years old, leave office within a short time of each other. If a Senator were to die, Hawaii election law requires that the governor appoint a replacement of the same party.

Hawaii's other members of Congress, Rep. Neil Abercrombie and Sen. Daniel Inouye, pledged their support to Akaka.

Debates 
Complete video of debate, August 31, 2006

Polling

Results

Republican primary

Candidates 
 Mark Beatty, attorney and businessman
 Jerry Coffee, retired Navy captain, Vietnam War POW, and motivational speaker (withdrew from the race before the Republican primary but his name still appeared on the ballot)
 Charles "Akacase" Collins 
 Jay Friedheim, attorney and candidate for the U.S. Senate in 1998 and 2004 
 Eddie Pirkowski, businessman
 Steve Tataii, conflict resolution teacher and author

Results 

Hawaii State Representative Cynthia Thielen was selected to be the Republican nominee after Jerry Coffee, who had previously withdrawn his candidacy, won the primary.

General election

Candidates 
 Daniel Akaka (D), incumbent U.S. Senator
 Cynthia Thielen (R), Hawaii State Representative
 Lloyd Mallan (L), perennial candidate

Predictions

Polling

Results 

Akaka won in all 4 Hawaii counties, taking at least 60% of the vote in each area.

See also 
 2006 United States Senate elections

References

External links 
Official campaign websites (Archived)
 Daniel Akaka campaign website
 Ed Case campaign website
 Mark Beatty campaign website
 Cynthia Thielen campaign website
 Steve Tataii campaign website
 Lloyd "Jeff" Mallan campaign website

Hawaii
2006
2006 Hawaii elections